Sir Kīngi Matutaera Īhaka  (18 October 1921 – 1 January 1993), known to his family as Matu Īhaka, was a New Zealand clerk, interpreter, Anglican priest, broadcaster and Māori Language Commissioner. Of Māori descent, he identified with the Te Aupōuri iwi. He was born in Te Kao, Northland, New Zealand, on 18 October 1921.

Īhaka was appointed a Member of the Order of the British Empire in the 1970 Queen's Birthday Honours, for services to the Anglican Māori Church. In the 1989 New Year Honours, he was made a Knight Bachelor, for services to the Māori people. In 1990, he was awarded the New Zealand 1990 Commemoration Medal. He was buried at Purewa Cemetery in the Auckland suburb of Meadowbank.

References

1921 births
1993 deaths
Interpreters
20th-century New Zealand Anglican priests
Māori language revivalists
Te Aupōuri people
New Zealand Māori religious leaders
People from the Northland Region
New Zealand public servants
New Zealand Māori public servants
New Zealand Knights Bachelor
New Zealand Members of the Order of the British Empire
20th-century translators
New Zealand justices of the peace
Burials at Purewa Cemetery